Sandro Bazadze (born 29 July 1993) is a Georgian right-handed sabre fencer, 2022 individual European champion, and two-time Olympian. 

Bazadze competed in the 2016 Rio de Janeiro Olympic Games and 2020 Tokyo Olympic Games.

Medal Record

World Championship

European Championship

Grand Prix

World Cup

References

External links
Profile at the European Fencing Confederation

1993 births
Living people
Male sabre fencers from Georgia (country)
Fencers at the 2016 Summer Olympics
Olympic fencers of Georgia (country)
Fencers at the 2020 Summer Olympics
20th-century people from Georgia (country)
21st-century people from Georgia (country)
World Fencing Championships medalists